Vladimir Belyayev may refer to:
Vladimir Belyayev (footballer) (1933–2001), Soviet football player
Volodymyr Byelyayev (born 1944), Soviet Olympic gold medalist in volleyball in 1968
Vladimir Belyaev (weightlifter) (born 1940), Soviet Olympic silver medalist in weightlifting in 1968
Vladimir Pavlovich Belyaev (1909–1990), Soviet Russian writer born in Ukraine
Vladimir Mikhailovich Belyaev (born 1965), minister of information and telecommunications of Transnistria
Vladimir Belyayev (ice hockey) (born 1958), Kazakhstani ice hockey coach